Renuka is a Hindu goddess. 

Renuka may also refer to:

People 
 Renuka (actress) (born 1970), Tamil television actress
 Renuka Chowdary, politician and former MP from Andhra Pradesh, India
 Renuka Devi Barkataki (born 1932), politician from Assam, India
 Renuka Herath (1945–2017), Sri Lankan politician and former Member of Sri Lanka Parliament
 Renuka Jeyapalan, Canadian film director
 Renuka Kesaramadu (born 1957), painter and art curator from Karnataka, India
 Renuka Menon, Malayali film actress
 Renuka Ravindran (born 1943), Academic and  Dean of Indian Institute of Science
 Renuka Shahane (born 1966), Marathi and Hindi television actress

Places 
 Renuka Lake, a lake in Himachal Pradesh, India
 Renuka Sanctuary, Reserve Forest and sanctuary around Renuka Lake
 Renuka sagara, a picnic spot on the Malaprabha river in Karnataka, India

Other uses 
 "Renuka", a poem by Indian poet Ramdhari Singh 'Dinkar' in 1935
 Renuka (genus), a beetle genus
 Renuka Holdings, a Sri Lankan conglomerate company founded by Indu Renuka Rajyiah